Zulu kaMalandela (1627–1709), son of Malandela, was the founder and chief of the Zulu clan.

The Zulu and the Qwabe were originally independent Bantu clans. When the King of these clans, Malandela died, he divided the kingdom into two clans, the Qwabes and the Zulus. In the Nguni language, Zulu means Heaven.

External links

Zulu kings
1627 births
1709 deaths

fr:Chefs des Zoulous avant 1816